The Samuel Project is a 2018 family comedy drama film directed by Marc Fusco. It stars Hal Linden and Ryan Ochoa.

Plot
A high school teen reconnects with his Jewish grandfather and creates art based on his experience in The Holocaust.

Cast
 Hal Linden
 Ryan Ochoa
 Mateo Arias
 Michael B. Silver
 Ken Davitian
 Liza Lapira
 Catherine Siggins

Production

Development 
In an interview with AARP, Linden talks about distancing the film from Schindler's List. He states “so the movie became less of a Holocaust picture and more about a boy pursuing his dream of being an artist. [...] The Samuel Project is about three generations that don’t communicate much — it isn’t until art tells the story that you get communication.”

Casting 
Fusco cast Linden, Lapira and Bowgen during the time they were performing in Steve Martin's Picasso at the Lapin Agile at San Diego's Old Globe Theater.

Filming 
Principal photography took place in March and April 2017 in San Diego. "Action traveled to the streets of Hillcrest, a pawn shop on University Avenue, the Chuck Jones Gallery in the Gaslamp, Balboa Park, a La Jolla estate masquerading as a Newport Beach mansion, a farm in Ramona, Shelter Island Cleaners, and more."

Themes
Dave McNary of Variety said "Through art, the film explores how Jewish immigrants struggled to find new homes in the U.S. following World War II and explores themes of the universal struggle for acceptance and opportunity with direct relevance to today’s headlines."

Release
The Samuel Project had a limited release on September 28, 2018 and expanded to nationwide on October 5, 2018. It was distributed by in8 Releasing and selected by AMC Independent, with Fusco adding "Audiences are hungry for independent, character-driven films like ours which are a refreshing alternative to the big blockbuster franchises."

Reception

Critical response 
Kimber Myers of the Los Angeles Times said "Despite its flaws, The Samuel Project is likely to make an impact on open-hearted audiences, with extra credit due Linden for an authentic performance in line with the actor's body of work." Tim Appelo of AARP scored it 3 out of 5 and said "It could use more of grandpa's drama and less teen dramedy, but it's heartwarming." John Delia of Aced Magazine called it "a very good inspirational film" scoring it 4 out of 5 stars.

Accolades 
The family-friendly film won three San Diego Film Awards, Best Narrative Feature, Best Actor for Hal Linden and Best Director for Marc Fusco. Ryan Ochoa was also nominated for Best Actor.

See also

 List of media set in San Diego

References

External links
 
 
 

2010s coming-of-age comedy-drama films
2010s educational films
2010s high school films
2010s teen comedy-drama films
2018 comedy films
2018 comedy-drama films
2018 films
2018 drama films
2018 independent films
American coming-of-age comedy-drama films
American films with live action and animation
American films based on actual events
American high school films
American independent films
American teen comedy-drama films
Films about Jews and Judaism
Films about students
Films about the aftermath of the Holocaust
Films about the visual arts
Films set in San Diego
Films shot in San Diego
Films about father–son relationships
Social guidance films
2010s English-language films
2010s American films
American educational films